Bentonville is an unincorporated community in Warren County, Virginia, United States. Bentonville has a post office with ZIP code 22610.

It is the birthplace of Hollywood actor David Arquette.

References

Unincorporated communities in Warren County, Virginia
Unincorporated communities in Virginia